Park Arthur Manross (10 June 1895 – 24 January 1951) was a Progressive Conservative party member of the House of Commons of Canada. He was born in United States and became an advertising consultant, industrialist and sales and marketing consultant by career.

Manross was born in Pennsylvania, United States and served in the military in World War I. He moved to London to found the Ruggles Motor Truck Company then acquired the assets of soft drink firm National Dry, developing this into a successful business. He also established the Wishing Well Products company.

He was first elected to Parliament at the London riding in the 1945 general election then defeated at the 1949 election by Alex Jeffery of the Liberal party.

Manross died in London, Ontario at Victoria Hospital on the afternoon of 24 January 1951, leaving his wife.

References

External links
 

1895 births
1951 deaths
American expatriates in Canada
Businesspeople from Ontario
Canadian military personnel of World War I
Members of the House of Commons of Canada from Ontario
People from Pennsylvania
Politicians from London, Ontario
Progressive Conservative Party of Canada MPs